The following is a list of episodes for the 2006 Tiger Aspect Productions television series Robin Hood. The first series ran from 7 October – 30 December 2006, the second series from 6 October – 29 December 2007 and the third from 28 March – 27 June 2009.

Series overview

Episodes

Series 1 (2006)

Series 2 (2007)

Series 3 (2009)

References

External links 
 

Episodes
Lists of British period drama television series episodes
Lists of British children's television series episodes
Robin Hood (2006 TV series) episodes
Robin Hood